David Hoflin (born 25 February 1979) is a Swedish-born Australian actor. He is most famous for playing Jason Bates in Ocean Girl between 1994 and 1998, and Oliver Barnes in Neighbours between 2007 and 2008.

Career
He has appeared in TV shows such as Ocean Girl, The Flying Doctors, Head Start, A Country Practice, McLeod's Daughters, Supernatural, State Coroner, Crossbones, and The Lost World.

Hoflin was ten when he starred in his first role alongside Meryl Streep and Sam Neill in Evil Angels (released as A Cry in the Dark outside of Australia and New Zealand), a film about the famous tragic case where a dingo stole baby Azaria Chamberlain from her tent at Ayers Rock.

In the Australian medical drama All Saints, he played a character named Kieran who had become heavily intoxicated with alcohol at a rave and subsequently passed out and neglected his younger sister, who was later raped by his friend Lewis.

In Ocean Girl, he played one of the lead male characters. The romantic chemistry between his character and that of Marzena Godecki's character, Neri is one of the central themes of the series.

Hoflin joined Neighbours in 2007 as Oliver Barnes. He received the job without auditioning after Christian Clark quit with immediate effect. He filmed his last scenes on 6 May 2008, the same day as fellow cast member Daniel O'Connor. Hoflin returned to Neighbours in April 2011 for a two-week guest stint.

Hoflin joined the cast of Alcatraz in 2012. He plays Thomas "Tommy" Madsen, a supposedly deceased, former Alcatraz inmate who disappeared in 1963. He is Rebecca Madsen's grandfather. In 2013 he was also seen on Touch and on Season 8, Episode 20 of Criminal Minds. In 2014 he appears in Crossbones. In 2015 he was a guest star in Supernatural.  Hoflin currently plays Daniel in the Amazon Prime Video series The Peripheral.

Personal life
Hoflin was born in Stockholm, Sweden

Hoflin began a relationship with his Neighbours co-star Natalie Blair in 2008. The pair currently live together in Los Angeles. On 10 March 2012, Fiona Byrne of the Herald Sun reported the couple were engaged. They married on 4 January 2013 in Warburton, Victoria. Blair and Hoflin welcomed their first child, a son, on 29 July 2016.

Filmography

Film

Television

References

External links

Australian male film actors
Australian male child actors
Living people
1979 births
Male actors from Stockholm
Swedish emigrants to Australia
Australian male soap opera actors